The MP 14 is a rubber-tyred electric multiple unit with driverless operation for the Paris Métro. Manufactured by Alstom as part of the Alstom Metropolis family of units, it is the seventh generation of the rubber-tyred class of trains to be used on the system and is planned to be deployed on Line 14, Line 4, Line 11, possibly on Line 1 and Line 6.

The roll-out of the MP 14 triggers a significant reshuffle of the Métro’s rubber-tyred fleet. The MP 14 is now entering service on Lines 4 and 14, with Line 11 to follow in 2023. The Paris Métro will then redeploy their MP 89 (CA and CC) and 11 MP 05 trains to other lines, and withdraw all remaining MP 59 and MP 73 trains.

Background 

Recent changes in government regulations regarding rail transport (ORTF Law of 8 December 2009) now require that the STIF contribute 50% of funding for replacement rolling stock (as seen with the MF 2000 purchase for Line 9), and 100% of funding for rolling stock for new lines and extensions (as seen with the MP 05 purchase for Line 14). As a result, the STIF began compiling a master plan to analyze how to replace existing rolling stock with a new stock that can meet the needs of the growing Metro network. The results of the findings justified the need for a brand new series of rubber-tyred rolling stock.

The new rolling stock will increase capacity on some lines and replace older rolling stock on other lines. In 2012, STIF identified the need to expand capacity on Line 14, due to the planned simultaneous extensions north to Saint-Denis Pleyel and south to Orly Airport. Therefore, the STIF deemed it urgent to extend the train-sets from six to eight cars, something that was not fully realised on the Metro prior to the construction of Line 14 (all of the existing stations on the line are capable of handling eight-car train formations). The STIF also identified the need to replace the ageing MP 59 stock on Line 11 and the MP 73 stock on Line 6, both of which were predicted to reach the end of their useful lives by around 2020.

Orders 
In January 2015, RATP awarded the framework contract for the MP 14 trains to Alstom at an overall cost of €2 billion. An initial order of 35 eight-car fully-automated trains for Line 14 was confirmed with a cost of around €500m.

Further batches have subsequently been ordered - 20 six-car fully-automated trains for Line 4 ordered in December 2016 at a cost of €163m, 20 five-car manually-driven trains for Line 11 ordered in February 2018 at a cost of €157m, and an additional 19 trains for Line 11 ordered in July 2021.

Deliveries 
In 2019, the first MP 14 was delivered to the RATP. It was first tested on Line 1, as the northern section and new workshop of Line 14 had not been completed.
Tests including emergency braking, stopping in front of platform screen doors, as well as general endurance testing were undertaken at night while Line 1 was closed. After around a year, the train returned to Alstom to be fitted out for passenger service.

Line 14 
In June 2020, the first production MP 14-8 arrived on line 14. It was tested for 3 months with agents on board, and was introduced into passenger service in October 2020. 
Since that date approximately, 2 trains have been delivered per month by Alstom, where they remain for 2 weeks in final tests, then are introduced into passenger service on the line. Unlike the MP 89 CA and MP 05, MP 14-8 trains are 8 cars in length, and therefore the introduction of them into passenger service greatly increases capacity on Line 14.

Line 4 
In 2019, a test train was delivered to carry out tests on Line 4 at night and on Sunday mornings. A second joined it in March 2022. 
The Mp14-6 trains entered passenger service when the line began operating in full automation (injection of automatic trains into manual traffic) on September 13, 2022.

Line 11 
Line 11 received an MP 14-5 in October 2021, which is used for testing on the section between the new Atelier and Rosny station on the extension. Unlike other MP 14 trains, they will be operated manually.

In October 2022 the online tests, with 4 trains, are extended to the aerial part which is almost finished. The trains are loaded with ballast, to simulate the presence of passengers, and have thus circulated at different speeds to check the good behavior of the viaduct.

Driving training for drivers is scheduled for October 2022. The installation of the first trains on line 11 is estimated in June 2023 and the commissioning of the extension by the end of 2023. The extension towards Noisy-Champs (Grand Paris Express) would be for 2030 when the line will be completely automatic.

Description 

Like its predecessor the MP 89, this new class of rubber-tyred rolling stock will be divided into two subclasses:

A fully automated (CA) class, with eight cars per train (MP 14-8), operates on Line 14. A six car CA variant (MP 14-6) was also ordered for Line 4, which is being retrofitted for automatic operations.
A manually-driven (CC) class, with five cars per train (MP 14-5), to replace the MP 59 stock on Line 11.

Exterior 

The train looks very different from the previous generations MP 89 and MP 05 with their pointed noses (designed by Roger Tallon, creator of the TGV design among others). The front of the train has a flat face, with a LED strip. The body is curved like the MF77 stock in order to save some space. The windows no longer have perfectly rectangular glass surfaces, but now have rounded corners.

The MP14 will be delivered with the new Île-de-France Mobilités livery (featuring white with grey accents and light blue stripes), replacing the RATP jade green livery.

On the manually-driven MP 14's on Line 11, the end window will be replaced with a cabin access door.

Interior 
Inside the train, the predominant colour is white with gray-beige at lower levels. The seats are blue, with red for the reserved places. Their arrangement is transverse 2 + 1/2 + 0, with spaces for suitcases and baggage. Space for wheelchairs are also located throughout the train.

The lighting is exclusively LED, including the vertical strips along the columns near the doors which turn orange when doors are closing (accompanied by a loud audio cue).

Passenger information is provided by AVSA (Annonces Visuelles et Sonores Automatiques), with an illuminated line plan above the doors, as well as audible announcements. There are also LCD screens which display the next stop, connections, the destination of the train, the geographic route of the line and — when approaching the station — the plan of the platforms and exits in relation to its position in the train, similar to displays in Japan.

Trains are equipped with full air conditioning to maintain a pleasant temperature, the windows cannot be opened.

Technical characteristics 
The MP14, like its predecessors, uses the CL449 type bogie with iron wheels and tires. They are designed for use at 80 km/h in normal service.
These are mono-motor bogies, whose engine is in the central position, and in the axis. It is equipped with two suspensions: rubber spring for the primary, and pneumatic spring for the secondary, allowing significant comfort.

The power control system is an OniX 572 type inverter using IGBT components manufactured by Alstom.
All traction, motors and inverters, is supervised by AGATE (Advanced Gec Alstom Traction Electronic).

Orders

Formations

Line 4 
  use driverless trains in a 6-car formation, Mp14-6 (4M2T) . The extension to Bagneux–Lucie Aubrac was opened in 2022, and, as of March 2022, the automation of the line is set to be completed by the end of 2023.

As of 10 October 2022, 2 6-car sets were allocated to Saint-Ouen Depot on Line 4.

Line 11 
  will use trains with drivers. These will be 5-car trainsets, MP14-5. (3M2T) (unlike the current 4-car MP 59s).

As of 6 January 2023, 7 5-car sets were allocated to Rosny Depot for use (test) on Line 11.

Line 14 
  is the first line to receive its MP14 trains, MP14-8 (5M3T). They are fully automated trains, without a driver.

As of 14 January 2023, 33 8-car sets were allocated to Saint-Ouen Depot for use on M14 Line.
When the southern expansion opens (2024), the Morangis depot will also open.

"M" motorized car
"T" Trailer car

Gallery

References 
The information in this article is based on that in its French equivalent.

  STIF - Modernization of metro - Press release of February 8, 2012 Retrieved May 3, 2012.
  STIF - Prolongement de la ligne 11 à l’est - February, 2013 Retrieved February 21, 2013.
  - Les nouvelles rames MP14 arrivent sur la ligne 14 du métro parisien Retrieved October 12, 2020
  "Etude et fourniture de trains sur pneumatiques destinés aux lignes 1, 4, 6, 11 et 14 du métro parisien et du Nouveau Grand Paris.", avisdemarche.com via web.archive.org, 11 May 2013 (retrieved 12 November 2019)
  "Île-de-France Mobilités lance le remplacement des rames de la ligne 11 du métro francilien" [PDF], iledefrance-mobilites.fr [archive], 13 December 2017 (retrieved 18 January 2018).

 Rail et Transports Retrieved February 14, 2019

MP NG
Paris Métro line 14
Paris Métro line 11
Paris Métro line 4
Paris Métro line 6
750 V DC multiple units
Alstom multiple units